Atticus Jerome "Jack" Connell, Jr. (September 10, 1919 – February 6, 2013) was an American politician. He was a member of the Georgia House of Representatives from 1969 to 2002. He was a member of the Democratic party. He served as Speaker Pro Tempore of the House from 1977 until his retirement in 2002.

References

|-

|-

|-

|-

|-

1919 births
2013 deaths
Democratic Party members of the Georgia House of Representatives
People from Richmond County, Georgia
Politicians from Augusta, Georgia
21st-century American politicians